Joseph Johnstone Muir (July 30, 1847 – November 17, 1927) was a Baptist clergyman who served as Chaplain of the United States Senate.

Early years

Joseph Johnstone Muir was born in Parsonstown, Ireland on July 30, 1847, to Scots-Irish parents, Alexander Johnstone and Mary Faith Stothard Muir. He worked for a time in business in Dublin before moving to the United States in 1863.  He continued in business in New York.

Ministry

In 1869 he was licensed to preach by the Baptist church.  He served in succession: the Baptist church in Oxford, New Jersey; the East Marion Baptist Church on Long Island; First Baptist Church of Ticonderoga, New York; McDougal Street Baptist Church, New York City; the Park Baptist Church in Port Richmond, New York on Staten Island; North Street Baptist Church, Philadelphia; the E Street or Third Baptist Church of Washington, D.C. and the Temple Baptist Church also in Washington.

He was elected Chaplain of the Senate on January 21, 1921, serving until his death in Washington on November 17, 1927. He was buried at Rock Creek Cemetery.

Personal life

In 1868 he married Lizzie Glover; they were the parents of three sons and two daughters – Edward A. T. Muir, Charles Stothard Muir, John McM. Glover Muir, Florence Evelyn May Muir and Edna Alexandra Muir.

References

1927 deaths
1847 births
Burials at Rock Creek Cemetery
Chaplains of the United States Senate